Los viejos estandartes («The old banners» in Spanish) is the official hymn and march of the Chilean Army.

Despite its symbolism associated to Augusto Pinochet's regime, the march also has been sung by socialist politicians like the president Michelle Bachelet or José Antonio Viera-Gallo.

Origin 
The march was inspired by the return of Manuel Baquedano to the city of Valparaiso in 1881 during the War of the Pacific. The lyrics were composed by Jorge Inostroza and the music was created by Willy Bascuñán, a member of Los Cuatro Cuartos. The song was included in the album ¡Al 7° de Línea! by Los Cuatro Cuartos which was released in 1966 and was acclaimed by both the public and critics, reaching the top of the music charts in Chile.

"Los viejos estandartes" was used alongside the "Himno de Yungay" in official ceremonies from 1967 onward, becoming part of the official repertoire of songs played by military and civil marching bands on national holidays. It was officially adopted as the official hymn of the Chilean Army in 1976, the 190th anniversary since the conclusion of the War of the Pacific.

References

Bibliography 
 History of Los Cuatro Cuartos

External links 

 Musical interpretation of "Los viejos estandartes" in YouTube

1976 establishments in Chile
Chilean Army
Military marches